Robert Woodrow Wilson (born January 10, 1936) is an American astronomer who, along with Arno Allan Penzias, discovered cosmic microwave background radiation (CMB) in 1964. The pair won the 1978 Nobel Prize in Physics for their discovery.

While doing tests and experiments with the Holmdel Horn Antenna at Bell Labs in Holmdel Township, New Jersey, Wilson and Penzias discovered a source of noise in the atmosphere that they could not explain. After removing all potential sources of noise, including pigeon droppings on the antenna, the noise was finally identified as CMB, which served as important corroboration of the Big Bang theory.

In 1970, Wilson led a team that made the first detection of a rotational spectral line of carbon monoxide  (CO) in an astronomical object, the Orion Nebula, and eight other galactic sources. Subsequently, CO observations became the standard method of tracing cool molecular interstellar gas, and detection of CO was the foundational event for the fields of millimeter and submillimeter astronomy.

Life and work
Robert Woodrow Wilson was born on January 10, 1936, in Houston, Texas. He graduated from Lamar High School in River Oaks, in Houston, and studied as an undergraduate at Rice University, also in Houston, where he was inducted into the Phi Beta Kappa society. He then earned a PhD in physics at California Institute of Technology. His thesis advisors at Cal Tech included John Bolton and Maarten Schmidt

Wilson and Penzias also won the Henry Draper Medal of the National Academy of Sciences in 1977. Wilson received the Golden Plate Award of the American Academy of Achievement in 1987.

Wilson remained at Bell Laboratories until 1994, when he was named a senior scientist at the Center for Astrophysics  Harvard & Smithsonian in Cambridge, Massachusetts.

Wilson has been a resident of Holmdel Township, New Jersey.

Wilson married Elizabeth Rhoads Sawin in 1958.

Wilson is one of the 20 American recipients of the Nobel Prize in Physics to sign a letter addressed to President George W. Bush in May 2008, urging him to "reverse the damage done to basic science research in the Fiscal Year 2008 Omnibus Appropriations Bill" by requesting additional emergency funding for the Department of Energy's Office of Science, the National Science Foundation, and the National Institute of Standards and Technology.

Wilson was elected to the American Philosophical Society in 2009.

References

Sources
 "Distinguished HISD Alumni", Houston Independent School District, Houston, Texas, 2008.
 Cite Video | BBC/WGBH BOSTON | NOVA #519 | A Whisper From Space | Copyright 1978 | Available With Permission | Consolidated Aircraft - Ronkonkoma, New York

External links
  including the Nobel Lecture, December 8, 1978 The Cosmic Microwave Background Radiation

1936 births
American astronomers
American Nobel laureates
21st-century American physicists
Lamar High School (Houston, Texas) alumni
California Institute of Technology alumni
Living people
Members of the United States National Academy of Sciences
Nobel laureates in Physics
People from Holmdel Township, New Jersey
Rice University alumni
Scientists at Bell Labs
Radio astronomers